The Oswego City School District is a school district in Oswego, New York, serving the students of the city of Oswego and the towns of Oswego, Minetto, and Scriba. The district promotes itself with the slogan "Where the Learning Never Ends," a play on the city of Oswego's slogan, "Where the Water Never Ends."

The current Superintendent of Schools is Dr. Dean Goewey. Aimee Callen is the current Board of Education president, with James Bell as current vice president. Brian Chetney, Thomas DeCastro, Brandon Lagoe, Lynda Sereno, and Samuel Tripp are also members of the board.

Schools
The schools operated by the district are:
 Oswego High School (9-12)
 Oswego Middle School (7-8)
 Fitzhugh Park School (K-6)
 Charles E. Riley School (K-6)
 Kingsford Park School (K-6)
 Frederick Leighton School (K-6)
 Minetto School (K-6)

Trinity Catholic School (K-6) and Oswego Community Christian School (K-12) are served by the district's buses but are not operated by the district.

Statistics
The Oswego City School District served 3,789 students as of 2016, with a student to teacher ratio of 12.2-1. In 2016, 37% of Oswego High School seniors graduated with a Regents Diploma, and 35% graduated with an Advanced Regents Diploma.

References

External links
 Official Site for the District

School districts in New York (state)
Education in Oswego County, New York
Oswego, New York